Al-Khidhir District is a district of the Al Muthanna Governorate, Iraq.

References 

Districts of Muthanna Governorate